Peter Noel Kirsten (born 14 May 1955) is a former cricketer who represented South Africa in 12 Test matches and 40 One Day Internationals from 1991 to 1994. He is the current coach of the Ugandan national side, having been appointed in August 2014.

Cricket career
Kirsten first attended Selborne Primary in East London, and in 1966 scored his first century at the age of ten. In 1967 the family moved to Cape Town and Kirsten was enrolled at the oldest school in the country, South African College School, also known as SACS. Kirsten represented Western Province at schools level in both rugby (Craven Week 1972–73) and cricket (Nuffield Week 1971-72-73). Kirsten made his debut for Western Province in first-class cricket while still at school, scoring 72 runs in the second innings. At the end of the 1973 Nuffield Week, he was selected for the South African Schools team. In the subsequent match against the Northern Transvaal first-class team he scored a century. He became only the fifth schoolboy to achieve this feat.

After enrolling at Stellenbosch University he played for S.A. Universities in 1976 and 1977, scoring centuries in both matches he played in. In 1978 he played for Western Province against S.A. Universities, again scoring a century. During the 1976–77 South African first-class cricket season he scored six centuries in seven innings.  Kirsten became a professional cricketer in 1978. He played for Derbyshire from 1978 to 1982 in 106 matches, scoring 7,722 runs at an average of 49.50. In South Africa he played for Western Province in 133 matches, scoring 9,087 runs at an average of 41.88. He captained Western Province for three seasons during the 1980s, achieving the first-class and One Day Tournament series double in 1981–82.

He represented South Africa in all 19 unofficial Rebel Test matches from 1982 to 1989, scoring 1,192 runs at an average of 41.10. Kirsten also captained South Africa in 6 of these matches, winning 4 times, losing 1 and drawing 1. During his first-class career he scored centuries in both innings of a match on three occasions, as well as eight double centuries, still the most by a South African batsman. In 1990 he moved to East London and became captain of the newly promoted Border team.

At the end of 1991, South Africa was invited to rejoin the International Cricket Conference, and went on their first ever tour of India. Kirsten played in all three ODIs, scoring 86 not out in the final match, earning him the man of the match award. Controversy surrounded the selection of the 1992 World Cup team, when Clive Rice, Jimmy Cook and Kirsten were omitted from the preliminary team. All three players were stalwarts of South African cricket during the exile years. Kirsten was eventually recalled to the team and became the team's most prolific run scorer at the tournament.

Kirsten made his Test debut in 1992 against the West Indies, aged 36 years and 340 days, scoring 52 in the second innings. On the 1994 South African cricket tour of England he scored a first-class century against Sussex, before aged 39 years and 84 days, he scored his first and only Test century against England at Headingley.

Peter Kirsten finished his career with 626 Test runs and 1,293 ODI runs.

Kirsten is currently a cricket commentator for SABC Sports.

Personal life
Kirsten married his wife Tuffy in 1983. After retiring from cricket he published a biography with Telford Vice, In the nick of time.

Kirsten comes from a sporting family, his father Noël Kirsten played first-class cricket for Border. Peter, his younger brother Andy and half-brothers Gary and Paul Kirsten represented Western Province. Gary also played in 101 cricket Tests for South Africa.

Rugby
In 1974, Kirsten played flyhalf for Western Province under-20 in a curtain raiser to the first test between the Springboks and the British and Irish Lions at Newlands Stadium in Cape Town. In wet conditions his ball handling abilities so impressed journalist John Reason, that special mention of this was made in his book, The Unbeaten Lions. Kirsten, aged 19, was selected to play for the Quaggas against the touring Lions. He scored 12 points as his team was defeated by 16 – 20. Following the Lions-Quagga game, he was duly selected to play for the Western Province rugby team, but in only his third match, he severely damaged his knee. It would take him out of rugby permanently.

References

External links 
 

1955 births
Living people
Cricketers from Pietermaritzburg
South Africa Test cricketers
South Africa One Day International cricketers
South African cricketers
South African Universities cricketers
Border cricketers
Derbyshire cricketers
Northamptonshire cricketers
Sussex cricketers
Western Province cricketers
South African rugby union players
Coaches of the Uganda national cricket team
South African cricket coaches
South African expatriate sportspeople in Uganda
Cricketers at the 1992 Cricket World Cup
South African expatriate sportspeople in England
Alumni of South African College Schools
Western Province (rugby union) players